Venusia (minor planet designation: 499 Venusia) is an asteroid in the outer asteroid belt, discovered by Max Wolf in 1902. Its diameter is 81 km (50.6 miles). It is a dark P-type asteroid.

References

External links
 
 

Hilda asteroids
Venusia
Venusia
P-type asteroids (Tholen)
19021224